Mandrake is a poisonous herbaceous plant in the genus Mandragora, often connected with magical rituals.

Mandrake may also refer to:

Biology
 Mandragora (genus), a genus in the family Solanaceae, including
 Mandragora autumnalis, mandrake or autumn mandrake (considered by some sources to be a synonym of Mandragora officinarum)
 Mandragora caulescens, Himalayan mandrake
 Mandragora officinarum, mandrake or Mediterranean mandrake
 Mandragora turcomanica, Turkmenian mandrake
 Bryonia alba, English mandrake or white bryony
 Podophyllum peltatum, American mandrake, a North American plant in the family Berberidaceae

Arts and entertainment

Film, television, and drama
 The Mandrake, a play by Niccolò Machiavelli
 The Mandrake (1965 film), a 1965 Franco-Italian film
 Mandrake (TV series), a Latin American TV series
Mandrake (1979 film), an American television thriller film
 Mandrake, a 2010 television film with Andrew Stevens

Fictional characters
 Mandrake, a short-lived mascot at the University of Oregon
 Mandrake the Magician, a comic strip character
 Caleb Mandrake, a character in The Skulls, a feature-length film by Rob Cohen
 Group Captain Lionel Mandrake, a character in Stanley Kubrick's film Dr. Strangelove
 John Mandrake (Nathaniel), a character from the Bartimaeus Trilogy
 Paolo Mandrake, the lawyer and amateur detective who is the protagonist of stories by Rubem Fonseca, and basis for the TV series
 Mandrake, a character in the animated feature Epic

Music
"Mandrake", a 1976 song on Gong's Shamal
Mandrake (album), a 2001 album by Edguy
Mandrake (German band), a gothic metal band
Mandrake (Japanese band), a progressive rock band
The Mandrake (band), an American death metal band

Literature and publishing
 Mandrake of Oxford, a small press
 Mandrake Press, a publishing company
 The Mandrake (Surrealist group), a 20th-century Chilean Surrealist group

People
 Leon Mandrake (1911–1993), magician
 Tom Mandrake (born 1956), comic book artist

Other uses
 Mandrake Linux, former name of Mandriva Linux, a computer operating system
 Yakovlev Yak-25 (NATO designation: Mandrake), a Soviet aircraft

See also
 Mandarake, a Japanese retail corporation